The Historic Silver Mine, is a  UNESCO World Heritage Site (since 2017) in Tarnowskie Góry, Silesia, Poland. The mine and the neighbouring Black Trout Adit are remnants of a silver mining industry. The museum is an Anchor point on the European Route of Industrial Heritage. It also joined The International Committee for the Conservation of the Industrial Heritage and the Silesian Tourist Organization.

History of mining
The region of Tarnowskie Góry is known for its historic lead ore mining. The ore mined here was galena, which is source of lead and silver. Since the 16th century it was one of the most important industrial centres in Eastern Europe. After the town had been established in 1526, Duke of Opole John II granted it the status of an independent mining town. The first part "Tarnowskie" came from the name of the village "Tarnowice" where deposits of galena had been found. The second part of the name "Góry" means "mountains" and it comes from the elevation around numerous shafts dug in the town.

The period of prosperity lasted until the end of the 16th century. In 17th century miners started to work at greater depths which created problems with water flooding the mine - the draining methods were not very efficient.  Thirty Years' War deepened the crisis even more. The industry collapsed, drainage equipment was destroyed. Epidemics and fires also plagued the town. Tarnowskie Góry was plundered by various armies, and the cost of destruction and contributions had to be paid by the inhabitants.

The region of Silesia was taken over by the Kingdom of Prussia in 18th century. King Frederick II delegated Friedrich Wilhelm von Reden and Friedrich Anton von Heynitz to resume mining activities in Silesia. Both of them were phenomenal professionals in the field of mining and metallurgy. In 1776 they both visited the largest English industrial centres, which in the second half of the 18th century were the forefront of European industry. There they learned the principles of operation of coal mines, coking plants, the use of steam engines, the construction of water channels and adits draining mining excavations. The drilling of the shafts began in October 1783. 72 miners were involved in the work. After 9 months of intensive work, on July 16, 1784, rich lead and silver ore deposit was found at a depth of 18 m in "Rudolfina" shaft. Two days later a similar discovery was made in the shafts "Łyszczonek" and "Opal". The new state mine of silver and lead was given the name Frederick.

Mining industry had to face the problem of water flooding the excavations. Horse treadmills were not able to drain the mine fast enough. In 1787 the first steam engine was brought from Wales by count Friedrich Wilhelm von Reden. The machine started to work on January 19, 1788. Water had been removed from the excavations and rich deposits of ore could be mined. Thanks to steam engines digging of the draining adit was also possible which finally led to removing the water from the mine without help of any additional devices.

Due to the depletion of galena ore, the mine began to gradually cease its activity at the beginning of the 20th century, definitively terminating its activity in 1913. For four centuries miners dug over 20,000 shafts and over 150 kilometers of underground corridors.

History of tourism and UNESCO Heritage Site
Researchers, scientists and history enthusiasts started to explore vast chambers and corridors left by miners more than 20 years ago. The first attempts to choose a fragment of the mine suitable for tourists were undertaken in the mid-1930s. Unfortunately the outbreak of World War II stopped the implementation of any projects.

In the 1950s a group of history enthusiasts founded Tarnowskie Góry Land Lovers Association, their main goal was to open a tourist route. Black Trout Adit - a part of the drainage system - was opened in 1957 and for decades was the longest underground boat tour in Poland. It was more difficult to create a safe route in a corridors of the mine itself. Finally the route between shafts: Angel, God Bless and Viper was opened for tourists on September 5, 1976.

In 2004 the president of Poland declared the mine a Historic Monument. Since 2006 it is a part of Silesian Industrial Monuments Route. In 2014 the mine became a part of the European Route of Industrial Heritage.

During 41st session of the World Heritage Committee on July 9, 2017, in Cracow, Poland, Historic Silver Mine and its Underground Management System was inscribed to the UNESCO Heritage List.

Historic Silver Mine today 
The mine is normally open for tourists, and guided tours in several languages take place every day (visits in languages other than Polish must be booked in advance). The tour starts in a museum and then tourists go underground to visit the corridors from the 18th and 19th centuries. The total length of the route is 1.7 km, with 270 metres  crossed in boats through the flooded corridor.

Open Air Steam Engine Museum surrounds the mine building, where children can have a ride on a small narrow-gauge railway.

References

External links

 Historic Silver Mine Website

Museums in Silesian Voivodeship
Mining museums in Poland
European Route of Industrial Heritage Anchor Points
Tarnowskie Góry County
World Heritage Sites in Poland
Silver mines